The 2016 San Francisco Giants season was the Giants' 134th year in Major League Baseball, their 59th year in San Francisco since their move from New York following the 1957 season, and their 17th at AT&T Park. They reached the postseason, where they defeated the New York Mets in the NL Wild Card Game but lost in four games to the eventual World Series champion Chicago Cubs in the Division Series.

Events
November 5, 2015 − The Giants decline to exercise options on OF Nori Aoki and OF Marlon Byrd, allowing them to become free agents.
November 17, 2015 – The Giants and IF Brandon Crawford agreed to a 6-year contract extension worth $75 million with a full no-trade clause and no option years.
December 3, 2015 – The Giants decline to tender the 2016 contracts on RHP Yusmeiro Petit and C Héctor Sánchez, allowing them to become free agents.
December 9, 2015 – The Giants sign RHP Jeff Samardzija to a five-year, $90 million contract.
December 16, 2015 – The Giants sign RHP Johnny Cueto to a six-year, $130 million contract with a club option for 2022. Cueto can opt out of the contract after two years.
January 7, 2016 – The Giants sign CF Denard Span to a three-year, $31 million contract.
January 13, 2016 – The Giants received a player to be named or cash considerations from the Arizona Diamondbacks in exchange for minor-league RHP Cody Hall.
February 1, 2016 – The Giants and RHP George Kontos agreed to a one-year, $1.15 million contract avoiding salary arbitration.
February 10, 2016 – The Giants and 1B Brandon Belt agreed to a one-year, $6.2 million contract avoiding salary arbitration.
April 9, 2016 – The Giants and 1B Brandon Belt agreed to a 5-year contract extension.
July 5, 2016 – The rosters for the 2016 Major League Baseball All-Star Game are announced, with C Buster Posey being named the National League's starter at catcher and to the all-star game for the fourth time. LHP Madison Bumgarner is named to his fourth all-star roster and RHP Johnny Cueto makes the all-star game for the second time.
July 5, 2016 – Brandon Belt won the Final Vote for the All-Star Game and makes his first appearance in the All-Star Game.
July 28, 2016 – The Giants acquire IF Eduardo Núñez from the Minnesota Twins in exchange for minor league LHP Adalberto Mejia.
August 1, 2016 – The Giants acquire LHP Will Smith from the Milwaukee Brewers in exchange for minor league LHP Phil Bickford and C Andrew Susac.
August 1, 2016 – The Giants acquire LHP Matt Moore from the Tampa Bay Rays in exchange for 3B Matt Duffy, minor league RHP Michael Santos, and minor league IF Lucius Fox.
September 27, 2016 – The Giants acquire 3B Gordon Beckham from the Atlanta Braves in exchange for minor league SS Rich Rodriguez.
November 11, 2016 – SS Brandon Crawford and C Buster Posey were named Wilson Defensive Players of the Year along with the team that named Defensive Team of the Year.

Season standings

National League West

National League Division Standings

Record vs. opponents

Game log and schedule

All schedule and scores taken from MLB.com.

|- style="text-align:center" style="background-color:#bfb;"
| 1 || April 4 || @ Brewers || 12–3 || Bumgarner (1–0) || Peralta (0–1) || — || 44,318 || 1–0
|- style="text-align:center" style="background-color:#bfb;"
| 2 || April 5 || @ Brewers || 2–1 || Cueto (1–0) || Nelson (0–1) || Casilla (1) || 24,123 || 2–0
|- style="text-align:center" style="background-color:#fbb;"
| 3 || April 6 || @ Brewers || 3–4 || Thornburg (1–0) || López (0–1) || Jeffress (1) || 20,098 || 2–1
|- style="text-align:center" style="background-color:#bfb;"
| 4 || April 7 || Dodgers || 12–6 || Heston (1–0) || Wood (0–1) || — || 41,940 || 3–1
|- style="text-align:center" style="background-color:#bfb;"
| 5 || April 8 || Dodgers || 3–2 (10) || Casilla (1–0) || Blanton (0–1) || — || 41,742 || 4–1
|- style="text-align:center" style="background-color:#fbb;"
| 6 || April 9 || Dodgers || 2–3 (10) || Hatcher (1–0) || Kontos (0–1) || Jansen (2) || 41,224 || 4–2
|- style="text-align:center" style="background-color:#bfb;"
| 7 || April 10 || Dodgers || 9–6 || Cueto (2–0) || Coleman (0–1) || Casilla (2) || 41,656 || 5–2
|- style="text-align:center" style="background-color:#bfb;"
| 8 || April 12 || @ Rockies || 7–2 || Samardzija (1–0) || Chatwood (1–1) || — || 20,814 || 6–2
|- style="text-align:center" style="background-color:#fbb;"
| 9 || April 13 || @ Rockies || 6–10 || Rusin (1–0) || Peavy (0–1) || — || 21,891 || 6–3
|- style="text-align:center" style="background-color:#fbb;"
| 10 || April 14 || @ Rockies || 6–11 || De La Rosa (1–0) || Cain (0–1) || — || 21,226 || 6–4
|- style="text-align:center" style="background-color:#fbb;"
| 11 || April 15 || @ Dodgers || 3–7 || Kershaw (2–0) || Bumgarner (1–1) || — || 53,449 || 6–5
|- style="text-align:center" style="background-color:#bfb;"
| 12 || April 16 || @ Dodgers || 4–3 || Cueto (3–0) || Kazmir (1–1) || Casilla (3) || 53,409 || 7–5
|- style="text-align:center" style="background-color:#fbb;"
| 13 || April 17 || @ Dodgers || 1–3 || Maeda (2–0) || Samardzija (1–1) || Jansen (5) || 48,911 || 7–6
|- style="text-align:center" style="background-color:#fbb;"
| 14 || April 18 || Diamondbacks || 7–9 (11) || De La Rosa (1–3) || Heston (1–1) || Ziegler (3) || 41,432 || 7–7
|- style="text-align:center" style="background-color:#fbb;"
| 15 || April 19 || Diamondbacks || 0–3 || Ray (1–0) || Cain (0–2) || Clippard (1) || 41,218 || 7–8
|- style="text-align:center" style="background-color:#fbb;"
| 16 || April 20 || Diamondbacks || 1–2 || Greinke (1–2) || Bumgarner (1–2) || Ziegler (4) || 41,497 || 7–9
|- style="text-align:center" style="background-color:#fbb;"
| 17 || April 21 || Diamondbacks || 2–6 || Wagner (1–0) || Cueto (3–1) || — || 41,052 || 7–10
|- style="text-align:center" style="background-color:#bfb;"
| 18 || April 22 || Marlins || 8–1 || Samardzija (2–1) || Cosart (0–1) || — || 41,760 || 8–10
|- style="text-align:center" style="background-color:#bfb;"
| 19 || April 23 || Marlins || 7–2 || Peavy (1–1) || Fernández (1–2) || — || 41,886 || 9–10
|- style="text-align:center" style="background-color:#fbb;"
| 20 || April 24 || Marlins || 4–5 || Barraclough (1–0) || Osich (0–1) || Ramos (3) || 41,509 || 9–11
|- style="text-align:center" style="background-color:#bfb;"
| 21 || April 25 || Padres || 5–4 || Bumgarner (2–2) || Pomeranz (2–2) || Casilla (4) || 41,266 || 10–11
|- style="text-align:center"  style="background-color:#bfb;"
| 22 || April 26 || Padres || 1–0 || Cueto (4–1) || Shields (0–4) || — || 41,413 || 11–11
|- style="text-align:center" style="background-color:#bfb;"
| 23 || April 27 || Padres || 13–9 || Samardzija (3–1) || Cashner (1–2) || — || 41,357 || 12–11
|- style="text-align:center" style="background-color:#fbb;"
| 24 || April 29 || @ Mets || 1–13 || Matz (3–1) || Peavy (1–2) || — || 39,764 || 12–12
|- style="text-align:center" style="background-color:#fbb;"
| 25 || April 30 || @ Mets || 5–6 || deGrom (3–0) || Cain (0–3) || Familia (8) || 44,666 || 12–13
|-

|- style="text-align:center" style="background-color:#bfb;"
| 26 || May 1 || @ Mets || 6–1 || Bumgarner (3–2) || Syndergaard (2–1) || — || 39,077 || 13–13
|- style="text-align:center" style="background-color:#bfb;"
| 27 || May 2 || @ Reds || 9–6 || Mazzaro (1–0) || Ramírez (0–2) || Casilla (5) || 13,829 || 14–13
|- style="text-align:center" style="background-color:#bfb;"
| 28 || May 3 || @ Reds || 3–1 || Samardzija (4–1) || Cotham (0–1) || Casilla (6) || 14,309 || 15–13
|- style="text-align:center" style="background-color:#fbb;"
| 29 || May 4 || @ Reds || 4–7 || Straily (1–1) || Peavy (1–3) || — || 21,333 || 15–14
|- style="text-align:center" style="background-color:#fbb;"
| 30 || May 5 || Rockies || 7–17 || Bergman (1–3) || Cain (0–4) || — || 41,477 || 15–15
|- style="text-align:center" style="background-color:#bfb;"
| 31 || May 6 || Rockies || 6–4 || Bumgarner (4–2) || Bettis (3–2) || Casilla (7) || 41,358 || 16–15
|- style="text-align:center" style="background-color:#bfb;"
| 32 || May 7 || Rockies || 2–1 (13) || Law (1–0) || Miller (1–1) || — || 41,590 || 17–15
|- style="text-align:center" style="background-color:#fbb;"
| 33 || May 8 || Rockies || 0–2 || Butler (1–1) || Samardzija (4–2) || McGee (8) || 41,593 || 17–16
|- style="text-align:center" style="background-color:#fbb;"
| 34 || May 9 || Blue Jays || 1–3 || Sanchez (3–1) || Peavy (1–4) || Osuna (7) || 41,256 || 17–17
|- style="text-align:center" style="background-color:#fbb;"
| 35 || May 10 || Blue Jays || 0–4 || Happ (5–0) || Cain (0–5) || Osuna (8) || 41,464 || 17–18
|- style="text-align:center" style="background-color:#bfb;"
| 36 || May 11 || Blue Jays || 5–4 (13) || Suárez (1–0) || Tepera (0–1) || — || 41,372 || 18–18
|- style="text-align:center" style="background-color:#bfb;"
| 37 || May 12 || @ Diamondbacks || 4–2 || Cueto (5–1) || Greinke (3–3) || López (1) || 19,461 || 19–18
|- style="text-align:center" style="background-color:#bfb;"
| 38 || May 13 || @ Diamondbacks || 3–1 || Samardzija (5–2) || Miller (1–4) || Casilla (8) || 21,753 || 20–18
|- style="text-align:center" style="background-color:#bfb;"
| 39 || May 14 || @ Diamondbacks || 5–3 || Strickland (1–0) || Hudson (1–1) || Gearrin (1) || 32,448 || 21–18
|- style="text-align:center" style="background-color:#bfb;"
| 40 || May 15 || @ Diamondbacks || 2–1 || Strickland (2–0) || Ziegler (1–2) || Casilla (9) || 25,007 || 22–18
|- style="text-align:center" style="background-color:#bfb;"
| 41 || May 17 || @ Padres || 5–1 || Bumgarner (5–2) || Rea (3–2) || — || 24,433 || 23–18
|- style="text-align:center" style="background-color:#bfb;"
| 42 || May 18 || @ Padres || 2–1 || Cueto (6–1) || Pomeranz (4–4) || — || 23,518 || 24–18
|- style="text-align:center" style="background-color:#bfb;"
| 43 || May 19 || @ Padres || 3–1 || Samardzija (6–2) || Shields (2–6) || Casilla (10) || 26,417 || 25–18
|- style="text-align:center" style="background-color:#fbb;"
| 44 || May 20 || Cubs || 1–8 || Arrieta (8–0) || Peavy (1–5) || — || 41,750 || 25–19
|- style="text-align:center" style="background-color:#bfb;"
| 45 || May 21 || Cubs || 5–3 || Cain (1–5) || Lester (4–3) || Casilla (11) || 41,507 || 26–19
|- style="text-align:center" style="background-color:#bfb;"
| 46 || May 22 || Cubs || 1–0 || Bumgarner (6–2) || Hendricks (2–4) || Casilla (12) || 41,359 || 27–19
|- style="text-align:center" style="background-color:#bfb;"
| 47 || May 23 || Padres || 1–0 || Cueto (7–1) || Hand (1–1) || — || 42,099 || 28–19
|- style="text-align:center" style="background-color:#bfb;"
| 48 || May 24 || Padres || 8–2 || Samardzija (7–2) || Cashner (2–4) || — || 41,772 || 29–19
|- style="text-align:center" style="background-color:#bfb;"
| 49 || May 25 || Padres || 4–3 (10) || Kontos (1–1) || Hand (1–2) || — || 41,363 || 30–19
|- style="text-align:center" style="background-color:#fbb;"
| 50 || May 27 || @ Rockies || 2–5 || Chatwood (6–3) || Suárez (1–1) || McGee (14) || 32,901 || 30–20
|- style="text-align:center" style="background-color:#bfb;"
| 51 || May 28 || @ Rockies || 10–5 || Gearrin (1–0) || Estévez (1–2) || — || 39,253 || 31–20
|- style="text-align:center" style="background-color:#bfb;"
| 52 || May 29 || @ Rockies || 8–3 || Cueto (8–1) || Rusin (1–3) || — || 42,307 || 32–20
|- style="text-align:center" style="background-color:#fbb;"
| 53 || May 30 || @ Braves || 3–5 || Foltynewicz (2–2) || Samardzija (7–3) || — || 23,147 || 32–21
|- style="text-align:center" style="background-color:#bfb;"
| 54 || May 31 || @ Braves || 4–0 || Peavy (2–5) || Wisler (2–5) || — || 15,723 || 33–21
|-

|- style="text-align:center" style="background-color:#fbb;"
| 55 || June 1 || @ Braves || 4–5 (11) || Withrow (1–0) || Law (1–1) || — || 15,107 || 33–22
|- style="text-align:center" style="background-color:#bfb;"
| 56 || June 2 || @ Braves || 6–0 || Bumgarner (7–2) || Blair (0–4) || — || 15,983 || 34–22
|- style="text-align:center" style="background-color:#bfb;"
| 57 || June 3 || @ Cardinals || 5–1 || Cueto (9–1) || Wainwright (5–4) || — || 43,560 || 35–22
|- style="text-align:center" style="background-color:#fbb;"
| 58 || June 4 || @ Cardinals || 4–7 || Lyons (2–0) || Samardzija (7–4) || Rosenthal (9) || 45,453 || 35–23
|- style="text-align:center" style="background-color:#fbb;"
| 59 || June 5 || @ Cardinals || 3–6 || Martinez (6–5) || Peavy (2–6) || Rosenthal (10) || 44,907 || 35–24
|- style="text-align:center" style="background-color:#fbb;"
| 60 || June 7 || Red Sox || 3–5 (10) || Tazawa (1–1) || Casilla (1–1) || Kimbrel (14) || 41,512 || 35–25
|- style="text-align:center" style="background-color:#bfb;"
| 61 || June 8 || Red Sox || 2–1 || Gearrin (2–0) || Price (7–3) || Strickland (1) || 41,635 || 36–25
|- style="text-align:center" style="background-color:#fbb;"
| 62 || June 10 || Dodgers || 2–3 || Kershaw (9–1) || Casilla (1–2) || Jansen (17) || 41,208 || 36–26
|- style="text-align:center" style="background-color:#bfb;"
| 63 || June 11 || Dodgers || 5–4 (10) || Stratton (1–0) || Jansen (2–2) || — || 41,358 || 37–26
|- style="text-align:center" style="background-color:#bfb;"
| 64 || June 12 || Dodgers || 2–1 || Peavy (3–6) || Urías (0–2) || Casilla (13) || 41,583 || 38–26
|- style="text-align:center" style="background-color:#bfb;"
| 65 || June 13 || Brewers || 11–5 || Suárez (2–1) || Knebel (0–1) || — || 41,543 || 39–26
|- style="text-align:center" style="background-color:#bfb;"
| 66 || June 14 || Brewers || 3–2 || Bumgarner (8–2) || Smith (1–1) || Casilla (14) || 41,750 || 40–26
|- style="text-align:center" style="background-color:#bfb;"
| 67 || June 15 || Brewers || 10–1 || Cueto (10–1) || Nelson (5–6) || — || 41,811 || 41–26
|- style="text-align:center" style="background-color:#bfb;"
| 68 || June 17 || @ Rays || 5–1 || Samardzija (8–4) || Archer (4–9) || — || 40,135 || 42–26
|- style="text-align:center" style="background-color:#bfb;"
| 69 || June 18 || @ Rays || 6–4 || Strickland (3–0) || Colomé (1–2) || Gearrin (2) || 23,948 || 43–26
|- style="text-align:center" style="background-color:#bfb;"
| 70 || June 19 || @ Rays || 5–1 || Law (2–1) || Cedeño (3–2) || — || 17,361 || 44–26
|- style="text-align:center" style="background-color:#fbb;"
| 71 || June 20 || @ Pirates || 0–1 || Locke (6–5) || Bumgarner (8–3) || Melancon (20) || 27,906 || 44–27
|- style="text-align:center" style="background-color:#bfb;"
| 72 || June 21 || @ Pirates || 15–4 || Cueto (11–1) || Boscán (1–1) || — || 27,729 || 45–27
|- style="text-align:center" style="background-color:#bfb;"
| 73 || June 22 || @ Pirates || 7–6 || Law (3–1) || Hughes (0–1) || Casilla (15) || 33,747 || 46–27
|- style="text-align:center" style="background-color:#bfb;"
| 74 || June 23 || @ Pirates || 5–3 || Suárez (3–1) || Niese (6–5) || Casilla (16) || 29,986 || 47–27
|- style="text-align:center" style="background-color:#bfb;"
| 75 || June 24 || Phillies || 5–4 || Peavy (4–6) || Araújo (1–1) || Casilla (17) || 42,238 || 48–27
|- style="text-align:center" style="background-color:#fbb;"
| 76 || June 25 || Phillies || 2–3 || Hellickson (5–6) || Bumgarner (8–4) || Gómez (20) || 41,928 || 48–28
|- style="text-align:center" style="background-color:#bfb;"
| 77 || June 26 || Phillies || 8–7 || Gearrin (3–0) || González (0–1) || — || 41,479 || 49–28
|- style="text-align:center" style="background-color:#fbb;"
| 78 || June 27 || Athletics || 3–8 || Mengden (1–3) || Samardzija (8–5) || — || 41,442 || 49–29
|- style="text-align:center" style="background-color:#fbb;"
| 79 || June 28 || Athletics || 11–13 || Neal (1–1) || López (0–2) || Madson (15) || 41,730 || 49–30
|- style="text-align:center" style="background-color:#fbb;"
| 80 || June 29 || @ Athletics || 1–7 || Manaea (3–4) || Peavy (4–7) || — || 32,810 || 49–31
|- style="text-align:center" style="background-color:#bfb;"
| 81 || June 30 || @ Athletics || 12–6 || Bumgarner (9–4) || Overton (1–1) || — || 36,067 || 50–31
|-

|- style="text-align:center" style="background-color:#bfb;"
| 82 || July 1 || @ Diamondbacks || 6–4 || Cueto (12–1) || Miller (2–8) || Casilla (18) || 24,859 || 51–31
|- style="text-align:center" style="background-color:#fbb;"
| 83 || July 2 || @ Diamondbacks || 5–6 || Barrett (1–0) || Strickland (3–1) || Ziegler (17) || 30,683 || 51–32
|- style="text-align:center" style="background-color:#bfb;"
| 84 || July 3 || @ Diamondbacks || 5–4 (11) || Osich (1–1) || Burgos (0–1) || Casilla (19) || 26,171 || 52–32
|- style="text-align:center" style="background-color:#bfb;"
| 85 || July 4 || Rockies || 3–1 || Peavy (5–7) || Anderson (0–3) || Casilla (20) || 41,874 || 53–32
|- style="text-align:center" style="background-color:#fbb;"
| 86 || July 5 || Rockies || 3–7 || Lyles (2–2) || Gearrin (3–1) || — || 41,753 || 53–33
|- style="text-align:center" style="background-color:#bfb;"
| 87 || July 6 || Rockies || 5–1 || Cueto (13–1) || de la Rosa (5–6) || — || 42,076 || 54–33
|- style="text-align:center" style="background-color:#bfb;"
| 88 || July 8 || Diamondbacks || 6–2 || Samardzija (9–5) || Corbin (4–7) || — || 41,576 || 55–33
|- style="text-align:center" style="background-color:#bfb;"
| 89 || July 9 || Diamondbacks || 4–2 || Kontos (2–1) || Ray (4–8) || Casilla (21) || 41,571 || 56–33
|- style="text-align:center" style="background-color:#bfb;"
| 90 || July 10 || Diamondbacks || 4–0 || Bumgarner (10–4) || Bradley (3–5) || — || 42,075 || 57–33
|- style="text-align:center; background:#bbcaff;"
| colspan="9" | 87th All-Star Game in San Diego, California
|- style="text-align:center" style="background-color:#fbb;"
| 91 || July 15 || @ Padres || 1–4 || Cashner (4–7) || Bumgarner (10–5) || Maurer (2) || 38,522 || 57–34
|- style="text-align:center" style="background-color:#fbb;"
| 92 || July 16 || @ Padres || 6–7 (10) || Quackenbush (6–3) || Casilla (1–3) || — || 40,550 || 57–35
|- style="text-align:center" style="background-color:#fbb;"
| 93 || July 17 || @ Padres || 3–5 || Jackson (1–1) || Cueto (13–2) || Maurer (3) || 35,784 || 57–36
|- style="text-align:center" style="background-color:#fbb;"
| 94 || July 19 || @ Red Sox || 0–4 || Porcello (12–2) || Peavy (5–8) || — || 38,082 || 57–37
|- style="text-align:center" style="background-color:#fbb;"
| 95 || July 20 || @ Red Sox || 7–11 || Barnes (3–3) || Cain (1–6) || — || 38,201 || 57–38
|- style="text-align:center" style="background-color:#fbb;"
| 96 || July 22 || @ Yankees || 2–3 || Miller (6–1) || Osich (1–2) || Chapman (20) || 45,304 || 57–39
|- style="text-align:center" style="background-color:#bfb;"
| 97 || July 23 || @ Yankees || 2–1 (12) || Casilla (2–3) || Swarzak (1–1) || Strickland (2) || 46,727 || 58–39
|- style="text-align:center" style="background-color:#fbb;"
| 98 || July 24 || @ Yankees || 2–5 || Eovaldi (9–6) || Samardzija (9–6) || Green (1) || 34,143 || 58–40
|- style="text-align:center" style="background-color:#fbb;"
| 99 || July 25 || Reds || 5–7 || DeSclafani (6–0) || Peavy (5–9) || Cingrani (11) || 42,147 || 58–41
|- style="text-align:center" style="background-color:#bfb;"
| 100 || July 26 || Reds || 9–7 || Cain (2–6) || Reed (0–5) || Casilla (22) || 41,896 || 59–41
|- style="text-align:center" style="background-color:#fbb;"
| 101 || July 27 || Reds || 1–2 || Straily (6–6) || Bumgarner (10–6) || Cingrani (12) || 42,079 || 59–42
|- style="text-align:center" style="background-color:#fbb;"
| 102 || July 28 || Nationals || 2–4 || Roark (10–6) || Cueto (13–3) || Kelley (5) || 42,001 || 59–43
|- style="text-align:center" style="background-color:#fbb;"
| 103 || July 29 || Nationals || 1–4 || Scherzer (11–6) || Samardzija (9–7) || Kelley (6) || 41,959 || 59–44
|- style="text-align:center" style="background-color:#bfb;"
| 104 || July 30 || Nationals || 5–3 || Law (4–1) || Petit (3–2) || Casilla (23) || 41,743 || 60–44
|- style="text-align:center" style="background-color:#bfb;"
| 105 || July 31 || Nationals || 3–1 || Cain (3–6) || González (6–9) || Casilla (24) || 41,795 || 61–44
|-

|- style="text-align:center" style="background-color:#fbb;"
| 106 || August 2 || @ Phillies || 8–13 || Neris (4–3) || Smith (0–1) || — || 23,351 || 61–45
|- style="text-align:center" style="background-color:#fbb;"
| 107 || August 3 || @ Phillies || 4–5 (12) || García (1–0) || Kontos (2–2) || — || 23,162 || 61–46
|- style="text-align:center" style="background-color:#bfb;"
| 108 || August 4 || @ Phillies || 3–2 (10) || Romo (1–0) || González (0–2) || Casilla (25) || 30,229 || 62–46
|- style="text-align:center" style="background-color:#fbb;"
| 109 || August 5 || @ Nationals || 1–5 || González (7–9) || Samardzija (9–8) || — || 34,036 || 62–47
|- style="text-align:center" style="background-color:#bfb;"
| 110 || August 6 || @ Nationals || 7–1 || Cain (4–6) || Strasburg (15–2) || — || 36,404 || 63–47
|- style="text-align:center" style="background-color:#fbb;"
| 111 || August 7 || @ Nationals || 0–1 || Roark (12–6) || Bumgarner (10–7) || Melancon (31) || 32,790 || 63–48
|- style="text-align:center" style="background-color:#bfb;"
| 112 || August 8 || @ Marlins || 8–7 (14) || Kontos (3–2) || McGowan (1–3) || — || 22,806 || 64–48
|- style="text-align:center" style="background-color:#fbb;"
| 113 || August 9 || @ Marlins || 0–2 || Koehler (9–8) || Moore (0–1) || Rodney (19) || 19,636 || 64–49
|- style="text-align:center" style="background-color:#bfb;"
| 114 || August 10 || @ Marlins || 1–0 || Samardzija (10–8) || Phelps (5–6) || Casilla (26) || 21,096 || 65–49
|- style="text-align:center" style="background-color:#fbb;"
| 115 || August 12 || Orioles || 2–5 || Bundy (6–3) || Cain (4–7) || Britton (36) || 41,479 || 65–50
|- style="text-align:center" style="background-color:#bfb;"
| 116 || August 13 || Orioles || 6–2 || Bumgarner (11–7) || Gausman (3–10) || Casilla (27) || 41,456 || 66–50
|- style="text-align:center" style="background-color:#fbb;"
| 117 || August 14 || Orioles || 7–8 || Brach (7–1) || Casilla (2–4) || Britton (37) || 41,268 || 66–51
|- style="text-align:center" style="background-color:#fbb;"
| 118 || August 15 || Pirates || 5–8 || Vogelsong (2–2) || Moore (0–2) ||  || 41,850 || 66–52
|- style="text-align:center" style="background-color:#fbb;"
| 119 || August 16 || Pirates || 3–4 || Bastardo (1–0) || Law (4–2) || Watson (6) || 41,185 || 66–53
|- style="text-align:center" style="background-color:#fbb;"
| 120 || August 17 || Pirates || 5–6 || Nicasio (9–6) || Cain (4–8) || Watson (7) || 41,139 || 66–54
|- style="text-align:center" style="background-color:#bfb;"
| 121 || August 18 || Mets || 10–7 || Bumgarner (12–7) || deGrom (7–6) || Casilla (28) || 41,517 || 67–54
|- style="text-align:center" style="background-color:#bfb;"
| 122 || August 19 || Mets || 8–1 || Cueto (14–3) || Lugo (0–2) || — || 41,434 || 68–54
|- style="text-align:center" style="background-color:#fbb;"
| 123 || August 20 || Mets || 5–9 || Colón (11–7) || Moore (0–3) || — || 41,125 || 68–55
|- style="text-align:center" style="background-color:#fbb;"
| 124 || August 21 || Mets || 0–2 || Syndergaard (11–7) || Samardzija (10–9) || Familia (41) || 41,377 || 68–56
|- style="text-align:center" style="background-color:#fbb;"
| 125 || August 23 || @ Dodgers || 5–9 || Maeda (13–7) || Bumgarner (12–8) || Jansen (36) || 46,899 || 68–57
|- style="text-align:center" style="background-color:#fbb;"
| 126 || August 24 || @ Dodgers || 0–1 || Hill (1–0) || Cueto (14–4) || Jansen (37) || 43,957 || 68–58
|- style="text-align:center" style="background-color:#bfb;"
| 127 || August 25 || @ Dodgers || 4–0 || Moore (1–3) || Stripling (3–5) || — || 53,297 || 69–58
|- style="text-align:center" style="background-color:#bfb;"
| 128 || August 26 || Braves || 7–0 || Samardzija (11–9) || De La Cruz (0–7) || — || 41,283 || 70–58
|- style="text-align:center" style="background-color:#fbb;"
| 129 || August 27 || Braves || 1–3 || Foltynewicz (7–5) || Suárez (3–2) || Johnson (13) || 41,635 || 70–59
|- style="text-align:center" style="background-color:#bfb;"
| 130 || August 28 || Braves || 13–4 || Bumgarner (13–8) || Blair (0–6) || — || 41,675 || 71–59
|- style="text-align:center" style="background-color:#fbb;"
| 132 || August 30 || Diamondbacks || 3–4 || Greinke (12–4) || Cueto (14–5) || Hudson (2) || 41,443 || 71–60
|- style="text-align:center" style="background-color:#bfb;"
| 133 || August 31 || Diamondbacks || 4–2 || Moore (2–3) || Miller (2–10) || Casilla (29) || 41,447 || 72–60
|-

|- style="text-align:center" style="background-color:#fbb;"
| 134 || September 1 || @ Cubs || 4–5 || Smith (1–0) || Strickland (3–2) || Edwards (1) || 38,536 || 72–61
|- style="text-align:center" style="background-color:#fbb;"
| 135 || September 2 || @ Cubs || 1–2 || Lester (15–4) || Suárez (3–3) || — || 40,818 || 72–62
|- style="text-align:center" style="background-color:#bfb;"
| 136 || September 3 || @ Cubs || 3–2 || Bumgarner (14–8) || Arrieta (16–6) || Casilla (30) || 41,250 || 73–62
|- style="text-align:center" style="background-color:#fbb;"
| 137 || September 4 || @ Cubs || 2–3 (13) || Cahill (4–4) || Reynolds (0–1) || — || 41,293 || 73–63
|- style="text-align:center" style="background-color:#fbb;"
| 138 || September 5 || @ Rockies || 0–6 || Bettis (12–7) || Moore (2–4) || — || 26,574 || 73–64
|- style="text-align:center" style="background-color:#bfb;"
| 138 || September 6 || @ Rockies || 3–2 || López (1–2) || Ottavino (0–2) || Casilla (31) || 22,437 || 74–64
|- style="text-align:center" style="background-color:#fbb;"
| 140 || September 7 || @ Rockies || 5–6 || Lyles (4–4) || Osich (1–3) || — || 23,961 || 74–65
|- style="text-align:center" style="background-color:#bfb;"
| 140 || September 9 || @ Diamondbacks || 7–6 (12) || Nathan (2–0) || Leone (0–1) || Gearrin (3) || 26,492 || 75–65
|- style="text-align:center" style="background-color:#bfb;"
| 141 || September 10 || @ Diamondbacks || 11–3 || Cueto (15–5) || Bradley (6–9) || — || 32,301 || 76–65
|- style="text-align:center" style="background-color:#bfb;"
| 142 || September 11 || @ Diamondbacks || 5–3 || Moore (3–4) || Greinke (12–6) || Strickland (3) || 26,008 || 77–65
|- style="text-align:center" style="background-color:#fbb;"
| 143 || September 12 || Padres || 0–4 || Clemens (3–5) || Samardzija (11–10) || — || 41,233 || 77–66
|- style="text-align:center" style="background-color:#fbb;"
| 144 || September 13 || Padres || 4–6 || Smith (1–0) || Strickland (3–3) || Quackenbush (2) || 41,231 || 77–67
|- style="text-align:center" style="background-color:#fbb;"
| 145 || September 14 || Padres || 1–3 || Perdomo (8–9) || Bumgarner (14–9) || Maurer (10) || 41,183 || 77–68
|- style="text-align:center" style="background-color:#bfb;"
| 146 || September 15 || Cardinals || 6–2 || Cueto (16–5) || Wainwright (11–9) || — || 41,210 || 78–68
|- style="text-align:center" style="background-color:#bfb;"
| 147 || September 16 || Cardinals || 8–2 || Moore (4–4) || Weaver (1–3) || — || 41,278 || 79–68
|- style="text-align:center" style="background-color:#fbb;"
| 148 || September 17 || Cardinals || 2–3 || Oh (5–3) || Casilla (2–5) || — || 41,403 || 79–69
|- style="text-align:center" style="background-color:#fbb;"
| 149 || September 18 || Cardinals || 0–3 || Reyes (3–1) || Suárez (3–4) || Oh (18) || 41,324 || 79–70
|- style="text-align:center" style="background-color:#fbb;"
| 150 || September 19 || @ Dodgers || 1–2 || Blanton (6–2) || López (1–3) || — || 43,435 || 79–71
|- style="text-align:center" style="background-color:#bfb;"
| 151 || September 20 || @ Dodgers || 2–0 || Cueto (17–5) || Hill (3–2) || Romo (1) || 53,621 || 80–71
|- style="text-align:center" style="background-color:#fbb;"
| 152 || September 21 || @ Dodgers || 3–9 || Maeda (16–9) || Moore (4–5) || — || 45,983 || 80–72
|- style="text-align:center" style="background-color:#bfb;"
| 153 || September 22 || @ Padres || 2–1 || Samardzija (12–10) || Friedrich (5–11) || Romo (2) || 25,789 || 81–72
|- style="text-align:center" style="background-color:#fbb;"
| 154 || September 23 || @ Padres || 2–7 || Jackson (5–6) || Suárez (3–5) || — || 28,404 || 81–73
|- style="text-align:center" style="background-color:#bfb;"
| 155 || September 24 || @ Padres || 9–6 (10) || Smith (1–1) || Quackenbush (7–7) || Romo (3) || 31,171 || 82–73
|- style="text-align:center" style="background-color:#fbb;"
| 156 || September 25 || @ Padres || 3–4 || Morrow (1–0) || Gearrin (3–2) || Hand (1) || 28,456 || 82–74
|- style="text-align:center" style="background-color:#bfb;"
| 157 || September 27 || Rockies || 12–3 || Moore (5–5) || Márquez (1–1) || — || 41,582 || 83–74
|- style="text-align:center" style="background-color:#fbb;"
| 158 || September 28 || Rockies || 0–2 || Chatwood (12–9) || Samardzija (12–11) || Ottavino (9) || 41,426 || 83–75
|- style="text-align:center" style="background-color:#bfb;"
| 159 || September 29 || Rockies || 7–2 || Cueto (18–5) || Gray (10–10) || — || 41,275 || 84–75
|- style="text-align:center" style="background-color:#bfb;"
| 160 || September 30 || Dodgers || 9–3 || Bumgarner (15–9) || McCarthy (2–3) || — || 41,359 || 85–75
|-

|- style="text-align:center" style="background-color:#bfb;"
| 161 || October 1 || Dodgers || 3–0 || Blach (2–0) || Kershaw (12–4) || Romo (4) || 41,320 || 86–75
|- style="text-align:center" style="background-color:#bfb;"
| 162 || October 2 || Dodgers || 7–1 || Moore (6–5) || Maeda (16–11) || — || 41,445 || 87–75
|-

Postseason

|-  style="text-align:center; background:#bfb;"
| 1 || October 5 || @ Mets || 3–0 || Bumgarner (1–0) || Familia (0–1) || — || 44,747 || 1–0 
|- style="text-align:center; style="background-color:#933;"

|-  style="text-align:center; background:#fbb;"
| 1 || October 7 || @ Cubs || 0–1 || Lester (1–0) || Cueto (0–1) || Chapman (1) || 42,148 || 0–1
|-  style="text-align:center; background:#fbb;"
| 2 || October 8 || @ Cubs || 2–5 || Wood (1–0) || Samardzija (0–1) || Chapman (2) || 42,392 || 0–2
|-  style="text-align:center; background:#bfb;"
| 3 || October 10 || Cubs || 6–5 (13) || Blach (1–0) || Montgomery (0–1) || — || 43,571 || 1–2
|-  style="text-align:center; background:#fbb;"
| 4 || October 11 || Cubs || 5–6 || Rondón (1–0) || Smith (0–1) || Chapman (3) || 43,166 || 1–3
|- style="text-align:center; style="background-color:#933;"
|colspan="11" | Giants lose series 1–3
|-

Roster

Postseason

Wild Card

Despite having claimed the Wild Card spot on the final day of the regular season, the Giants were able to tab ace Madison Bumgarner for the Wild Card game start. Bumgarner had an excellent regular season for the Giants, finishing with a career-low in ERA and a career-high in strikeouts, finishing fourth in the National League in both categories. On the hill for the New York Mets was Noah Syndergaard, who himself finished 3rd in the NL in ERA and 9th in strikeouts. The pitching matchup didn't disappoint, it took until the bottom of the third inning for the game's first hit and baserunner, with Syndergaard striking out four straight batters on two occasions. The closest either side came to scoring was in the top of the 6th when, after Denard Span singled and stole second base with two outs, Brandon Belt hit a long fly ball to center field which was caught on the dead run by Curtis Granderson, smashing into the wall and holding on. Syndergaard exited after 7 innings, having struck out 10. Crucially as it turned out, the Giants had forced Syndergaard out of the game with Bumgarner still going strong. Another golden opportunity was squandered by the Giants in the top of the 8th inning, when Addison Reed struck out Hunter Pence to end the inning with the bases loaded. After Bumgarner left a runner in scoring position in the bottom of the 8th, the game moved to the 9th with the Mets bringing in closer Jeurys Familia. Brandon Crawford led the inning off with a double to left-center, but Ángel Pagán couldn't lay down the sacrifice bunt and then struck out. Joe Panik worked a walk and Conor Gillaspie stepped up to the plate to launch a three-run home run to right field. Gillaspie had only started the game because Eduardo Núñez was still dealing with a hamstring injury and had to be left off the roster. Bumgarner then got the final three outs, completing the shutout just as he had done in the 2014 Wild Card Game. Bumgarner made 119 pitches, allowed just 6 total baserunners, striking out 6 and setting an MLB record of 23 consecutive scoreless innings pitched in postseason elimination games. With the win, the Giants equalled the Major League record for consecutive postseason series wins with 11, also extending their streak of postseason elimination game wins to 9.

Wednesday, October 5, 2016 – 8:07 p.m. (EDT) at Citi Field in New York City

Division Series

Game 1, October 7
The Giants started 18-game winner Johnny Cueto in Game 1 of the NLDS, while the Cubs countered with 19-game winner Jon Lester. Just as in the Wild Card game, both starting pitchers lived up to the billing, and dominated the opposing team's lineup. Also as in that game, the Giants had slightly more opportunities to score in the early innings, but were unable to take advantage of them. The Giants had the leadoff man on base in each of the first three innings, but the Cubs, with the help of a caught stealing and a successful pickoff play at first base were able to wipe the runners off base quickly. Lester seemed to improve as the game went on, and the Giants found it difficult to have extended at bats against him. After 8 dominant innings in which he made just 86 pitches, Lester looked set to come out of the game, as his spot in the lineup along with the spot of his catcher David Ross were due up, and it looked as though Cubs manager Joe Maddon would decide to pinch-hit for them both. In the end before the game reached that point, Javier Báez cranked a home run to left-field off Cueto which would ultimately seal the game. Cueto nonetheless pitched superbly, striking out 10 in his 8 innings of work and allowing just three hits in total. Neither starter walked a batter. Though Buster Posey doubled with two outs off Cubs closer Aroldis Chapman to give the Giants a faint hope, Hunter Pence grounded out to end the game and give the Cubs the lead in the series.

Game 2, October 8
The Giants started former Cub, Jeff Samardzija in Game 2. Samardzija had pitched well for the Giants down the stretch, but only lasted four innings in his last appearance at Wrigley Field. Unfortunately for the Giants, Samardzija produced a similar effort this time. Dexter Fowler led off the bottom of the 1st inning with a double and was eventually brought in to score on a two-out base hit by Ben Zobrist. The second inning proved Samardzija's undoing as he loaded the bases with nobody out on the way to giving up three more runs in the frame. A 4-run deficit to the Major League leader in ERA Kyle Hendricks appeared to be a large one already, but the Giants did bring themselves briefly back into the game. Joe Panik produced a leadoff double and that was followed by another from pinch-hitter Gregor Blanco spelling the end of the night for Samardzija. Blanco was brought in to score on a sacrifice fly from Brandon Belt and the Giants had halved the deficit. However, those were to be the only runs they would score. In the 4th inning, Hendricks took a line drive off the bat of Ángel Pagán off his arm and eventually decided to leave the game. This proved not to help the Giants as, not only did the Cubs bullpen shut them down the rest of the way, but also Travis Wood, brought on to relieve Hendricks, launched a solo home-run off George Kontos to pad the Cubs lead in the bottom half of the 4th. This was just the second time a relief pitcher has homered in a postseason game, the last time being in 1924. Aroldis Chapman locked down the save again, and the Giants were faced with elimination in Game 3.

Game 3, October 10
Facing a possible sweep, the Giants were able to call on Madison Bumgarner to take the mound and try to extend their streak of elimination game wins. As a mark of the strength of the Cubs rotation, they were able to start an 18-game winner and the reigning Cy Young Award winner Jake Arrieta. Bumgarner wasn't especially sharp and he struggled to put away hitters in the second inning, culminating in a three-run home run with two strikes to Arrieta. The Giants were staring down the barrel with a 3–0 deficit. Buster Posey singled home Denard Span in the third and the Giants narrowed the gap to one in the 5th inning, with Span again the catalyst, tripling and scoring on Brandon Belt's sacrifice fly. Bumgarner left the game after five innings and the bullpen managed to keep the Cubs in check. There looked to be a major turning point in the bottom of the 6th inning, when a play at first was reviewed. After a spectacular sliding save from Javier Báez at one end, it appeared from multiple angles that first baseman Anthony Rizzo may have taken his foot off the base, but much to the consternation of the crowd, the call stood as called, wiping out a lead-off runner as the Giants were running out of time. In the bottom of the 8th inning, Belt singled to lead off the inning off Travis Wood, and Héctor Rondón walked Posey. With two on and nobody out, Joe Maddon called on Aroldis Chapman for a six out save. After Hunter Pence struck out, Wild Card hero Conor Gillaspie lined a two-run triple to the gap in right-center to turn the tables and give the Giants the one-run lead. Brandon Crawford then singled through the drawn-in infield and the Giants had an insurance run to lead 5–3. Crawford then stole second base, and advanced to third on an errant throw but the Giants weren't able to cash him in. Sergio Romo came in to try to close out the game, but Dexter Fowler drew a walk on 8 pitches and Kris Bryant sent a deep fly ball to left field that hit the top of the wall and bounced over for a game-tying two-run home run. The 9th inning had been a huge problem for the Giants all season, and that problem had surfaced again at a crucial time. Romo did manage to pitch through the inning without surrendering the lead, and the game went to extra innings. In the end, it was a battle of two left-handed long relievers to see who would crack first, Ty Blach for the Giants and Mike Montgomery for the Cubs. Crawford led off the bottom of the 13th inning with a double, and that was followed by a walk-off double off the high wall in right field by Joe Panik, and the Giants ensured there would be a Game 4 in the series.

Game 4, October 11
The Giants turned to trade deadline acquisition Matt Moore to keep them in the series. Moore, who had pitched in the Game 162 win to see the Giants into the postseason would be opposed by John Lackey for the Cubs. The early going was good for the Giants as Denard Span doubled to lead off the Giants half of the 1st, and came into score on a sacrifice fly from Buster Posey. Though David Ross would homer to lead off the 3rd inning, the Giants would soon be back on top. With the bases loaded and 1 out in the bottom of the 4th, Moore singled home the go-ahead run, and another would come into score as Lackey couldn't maintain contact with first base as the Cubs attempted to double up Span. A throwing error from Brandon Crawford that allowed Javier Báez to reach third led to a Ross sacrifice fly that immediately cut the Giants lead to 1 in the 5th. The Giants were to hit right back as, after Hunter Pence singled with one out in the bottom half of the inning, Crawford made amends by launching a double that would have been a home run were it not for a short section of railing on the top of the wall of Levi's Landing. Both runners would come into score anyway as Conor Gillaspie came through again with an RBI base hit (one of four hits in the game for him), and Joe Panik hit a sacrifice fly to give the Giants a 5–2 lead. The Cubs bullpen again shut the Giants down the rest of the way, but Moore was gradually becoming the story in the game. After 8 innings, Moore had delivered 120 pitches, surrendering just 2 hits, 2 walks and 2 runs (one unearned) whilst striking out 10. However, in a stunning turn of events, five Giants relief pitchers combined to blow the game and the season in the 9th inning. Derek Law allowed a leadoff hit to Kris Bryant, Javier López walked Anthony Rizzo and Sergio Romo gave up an RBI double to Ben Zobrist setting up the tying runs in scoring position. Will Smith then entered to allow the tying hit to pinch-hitter Willson Contreras. Finally an out was recorded as Jason Heyward's sacrifice bunt ended up in a force play at second, but another Crawford error allowed Heyward to reach second base. Baez then came through for the Cubs again to bring in Heyward for the go-ahead run off Hunter Strickland. The Giants had blown another 9th inning lead, and didn't have a win in the 9th inning when trailing all season. Aroldis Chapman promptly struck out the side to eliminate the Giants. With the loss several streaks ended, the Giants equal MLB record 11 straight postseason series win streak, their MLB record 10 game elimination game win streak, and also their even-year World Series win streak dating back to 2010.

Postseason rosters

| style="text-align:left" |
Pitchers: 13 Will Smith 29 Jeff Samardzija 40 Madison Bumgarner 46 Santiago Casilla 47 Johnny Cueto 48 Steven Okert 49 Javier López 54 Sergio Romo 60 Hunter Strickland 64 Derek Law 70 George Kontos 
Catchers: 14 Trevor Brown 28 Buster Posey 
Infielders: 1 Ehire Adrianza 9 Brandon Belt 12 Joe Panik 21 Conor Gillaspie 35 Brandon Crawford 37 Kelby Tomlinson 
Outfielders: 2 Denard Span 6 Jarrett Parker 7 Gregor Blanco 8 Hunter Pence 16 Ángel Pagán 66 Gorkys Hernández
|- valign="top"
 

| style="text-align:left" |
Pitchers: 13 Will Smith 29 Jeff Samardzija 40 Madison Bumgarner 45 Matt Moore 46 Santiago Casilla 47 Johnny Cueto 49 Javier López 50 Ty Blach 54 Sergio Romo 60 Hunter Strickland 64 Derek Law 70 George Kontos
Catchers: 14 Trevor Brown 28 Buster Posey
Infielders: 9 Brandon Belt 10 Eduardo Núñez 12 Joe Panik 21 Conor Gillaspie 35 Brandon Crawford 37 Kelby Tomlinson
Outfielders: 2 Denard Span 7 Gregor Blanco 8 Hunter Pence 16 Ángel Pagán 66 Gorkys Hernández
|- valign="top"

Statistics

Batting
Note: G = Games played; AB = At bats; R = Runs scored; H = Hits; 2B = Doubles; 3B = Triples; HR = Home runs; RBI = Runs batted in; BB = Base on balls; SO = Strikeouts; AVG = Batting average; OPS = On base plus slugging percentage; SB = Stolen bases

Pitching
Note: W = Wins; L = Losses; ERA = Earned run average; G = Games pitched; GS = Games started; SV = Saves; IP = Innings pitched; H = Hits allowed; R = Runs allowed; ER = Earned runs allowed; HR = Home runs allowed; BB = Walks allowed; K = Strikeouts

Farm system

Notes

References

External links
2016 San Francisco Giants season 
2016 San Francisco Giants season at Baseball Reference

San Francisco Giants
San Francisco Giants seasons
San Francisco Giants
2016 in San Francisco